A record of decision (ROD) in the United States is the formal decision document which is recorded for the public.

EPA
In the US Environmental Protection Agency (EPA), an ROD is a public document that explains the remediation plan for the clean up a Superfund site.

FHWA
An ROD issued by the Federal Highway Administration (FHWA) signals formal federal approval of an environmental impact statement (EIS) or environmental assessment (EA) concerning a proposed highway project. The ROD authorizes the respective state transportation agency to proceed with design, land acquisition, and construction based on the availability of funds.

Federal Register
The ROD is announced in a notice of availability (NOA) in the US government daily journal the Federal Register.

See also
 Public records

References

External links
 USEPA RODs.

Publications of the United States government
Public records
United States administrative law